Low Island is an island lying about  north-east of Port Douglas in Trinity Bay, North Queensland. It is around 2 hectares or 0.02 square km in size. It is part of the Low Isles, along with Woody Island, an uninhabited coral and mangrove island. The Low Islets are a Marine National Park Zone. Day visitors come to the island on a daily basis via a number of commercial operators. There is a lagoon where private vessel can moor or anchor outside the reef protection markers overnight, but there is no overnight accommodation on the island. There is a weather station and an active lighthouse (named Low Isles Light). No fishing is allowed in the lagoon or within a buffer zone around the islands. Motorised water sports are not permitted in the locality. There is a 6 knot limit. No open fires of any sort or dogs permitted on either island. No island access between sunset and sunrise.

References

Islands of Queensland
Commonwealth Heritage List places in Queensland